The enzyme lactoyl-CoA dehydratase catalyzes the chemical reaction

lactoyl-CoA  acryloyl-CoA + H2O

This enzyme belongs to the family of lyases, specifically the hydro-lyases, which cleave carbon-oxygen bonds.  The systematic name of this enzyme class is lactoyl-CoA hydro-lyase (acryloyl-CoA-forming). Other names in common use include lactoyl coenzyme A dehydratase, lactyl-coenzyme A dehydrase, lactyl CoA dehydratase, acrylyl coenzyme A hydratase, and lactoyl-CoA hydro-lyase.  This enzyme participates in propanoate metabolism and styrene degradation.

References

 

EC 4.2.1
Enzymes of unknown structure